Move Music Festival is an annual music festival in Albany, New York. The event includes performances from bands across multiple venues as well as a music industry panel discussion. It features a diverse array of musical genres, including performers of alternative, indie, americana, hard rock, and EDM.

History
Move Music Festival was founded in 2012 by Bernie Walters of Indian Ledge Music Group, a New York-based music production and management collective. 

Walters has stated that the motivation for the creation of Move comes from his desire to give Capital Region musicians an opportunity to showcase their talents:

Lineups

2018
The seventh annual Move Music Festival took place on Saturday, April 28. The industry panel discussion was titled "How To Make Yourself Heard." Panelists included SUNY Oneonta music industry professor Nancy Tarr, producer and recording engineer Joe Blaney, manager and producer David Bourgeois, talent manager and consultant Peter Iselin, promoter and manager Steve Theo, radio personality DJ Supreme (aka Rodney B. More), festival producer Ronan Daly, and producer and manager Lauren Wundrock. The festival's musical lineup included:

Diet Cig
Jouska
C.K. and the Rising Tide

Auguste and Alden
Late Sea
Jeremy James and the Villianeers

The Avalon Hi-Fi
Ryan Leddick Trio
Aaron Rizzo

Sorrow Estate
School of Rock Albany
Girl Blue

2017
2017's Move was held from April 27 to 29, with festival acts including:

July Talk
Sawyer Fredericks
Jocelyn & Chris Arndt
Mister F
Alchemystics
Shinobi Ninja
Hard Soul

Lucy (formerly Better by Morning)
Space Carnival
Council
Kevlar
Hasty Page
The Energy
Small Town Glow
The Lateshift

Wess Meets West
Sun Voyager
Bad Mothers
Elephants Dancing
Craving Strange
C.K. Flach
Band of Ghosts

Molina
School of Rock Albany
BassBullets
Y2J
Ryan Leddick Trio
Boy Go Fast
The Rescott Renegade
Bathrobe Robots

2016
The fifth annual Move Music Festival took place in 2016 from April 22 through April 24. The lineup featured the following acts:

Skaters
Arkells
Giant Panda Guerilla Dub Squad
Eastbound Jesus
New Beat Fund
Mirk
Roots of Creation
New Madrid
Super 400
The Big Takeover
Titanics
The Parlor
Sirsy
Turbo Goth
Restless Streets
The Walking Tree
Trapped in Static
Treehouse!
Shane Guerrette
The Ricecookers
Chaser Eight
Silverbird
Danielle and Jennifer
Girl Blue

Jane Lee Hooker
DJ Scooter
Wyland
Last Daze
The Racer
Vera Bloom
Glazzies
Black Mountain Symphony
One Red Martian
North & South Dakotas
The Falling Birds
Echo Bloom
MAYVE
The Flux Machine
Hard Soul
Builder of the House
Hasty Page
The Wild Feathers
Space Carnival
The Lateshift
Gordon St.
Lord Electro
Blue Streak Blvd
Basic Cable Preachers

The Wonderbeards
Let's Be Leonard
Nine Votes Short
Darling Valley (formerly The Accents)
Revibe
Flakjacket
Ryan Leddick
Vada March
Humble Braggers
US Lights
Ampevene
Food Will Win the War
New Red Scare
Sly Fox and the Hustlers
Rechorduroys
Good Fiction
Tambourelli & Her Super Trips
Barroom Philosophers
Fort Rooster
The Boobies
Hoonch
Dead Stars
Carl Daniels
What is Broken

Nobody for President
Band of Ghosts
Shift the Paradigm
Benjamin John
Belle-Skinner
Seth Adam
Secret Beaches
Kyle Albano
The Rescott Renegade
The Shelters
Tommy Tommy Tommy
Civil Savages
Macero
Jason Irwin
Jae Sheen
School of Rock Albany House Band
Another Michael
Ryan Lovelock
Matt Butler
The Furies
Siobahn
Kulture
DJ Ryujin
DJ Wolverine

2015
2015's Move Music Festival was held from April 24 to 26. The industry panel discussion's keynote speaker was composer and producer Tony Shimkin.

Performing acts included:

Young Magic
Locksley
Shinobi Ninja
Mirk
Titanics
Rustic Overtones
Contact
goodbyemotel
Wild Adriatic
Jocelyn & Chris Arndt
Christina Custode
Sirsy
NOHC
Heaf
Shane Guerrette
The Tins
Anthony Fallacaro
Mind Over Time
Sheen
The Accents
The Racer
Analog Heart
Wyland
Classy Mongrel
Lemon Sky

Eric David
Breakfast in Fur
Lynette Williams
Justin Levinson
Charlie Brennan
Hard Soul
Gusto
The North & South Dakotas
Dolly Spartans
The LateShift
The Unknown Woodsmen
True Apothecary
Olivia Quillio
Squid Parade
Mad Kings
The Warp/The Weft
Jordan Okrend
Mark Schwaber
My Body
The Mysteios
Flakjacket
Space Carnival
Skip Monday
Better by Morning

Fort Rooster
Party Boat
Myron James
Baked Potatoes
Slowshine
Fiona Corinne
Doctor Magnum
Kayla and the Tellers
Klozapin
Candy Ambulance
Foxanne
Aisha Badru
Reve
Ampevene
Nobody for President
Carl Daniels and The Black Box
The Further Unsound
Jacob Restituto
Lunar Pacific
Joe Mansman and the Midnight Revival Band
Take 2
Kimono Dragons
Gordon St.
Many Trails

Kyle Albano
Melli & the Sparks
Wolf Critton
Lauren Hurley
Good Fiction
The Flam Flams
Jason Irwin
Steve Candlen
Faint Little Things
Cosmonaut Radio
Blueprints of the Heart
Father, Misty, and the Big Rock
Brianna Nelson
Xenolinguist
Jennifer Haley
The Montauk Project
Andrew James Mirabile
Ryan Leddick
Brian Lapoint & the Joints
DJ Scooter
Bassbullets
Comp3
DRYV3R
The Midnight Society

2014
The third annual Move Music Festival took place from April 25 to 27, 2014. The lineup included the following acts:

Magic Man
Black Taxi
Sirsy
The Big Takeover
Bastinado
Shinobi Ninja
Margo Macero
Titanics
goodbyemotel
Casey Desmond
Engloria
The Show
Bong Hits for Jesus

Stellar Young
Predator Dub Assassins
Dead Leaf Echo
Lost in Society
Trapped in Static
AIUR
Faith Ziegler
King Django
Black Eskimo
Parker Ainsworth
The Racer
Rachel Ann Weiss
Erin Harkes Band

Black Mountain Symphony
Twin Berlin
Party Boat
Digital Dharma
Flora Cash
The Slaughterhouse Chorus
Linear North
Vontus
The Warp/The Weft
Bridgette Guerrette
Jocelyn & Chris Arndt
Blackbutton
Durians

Fiction for Bandits
Psymon Spine
Bear Grass
Beaked Whale
Gusto
The Quick and the Dead
Sheen
Palemen
Deadpan Smile
Scary Americans
Boykiller

2013
The second annual Move Music Festival was held on April 27, 2013. The lineup included:

Young London
Sean Rowe
Black Light Dinner Party
Wild Adriatic
Paranoid Social Club
Mirk
Echo and Drake
Engloria
AIUR
The Tins
Carnival Kids
Musiciens Sans Frontieres
Jordan White
Lunatic
January Jane
Stellar Young
Anthony Fallacaro
The People's Blues of Richmond
Avalar
American Pinup
Art Decade
Margo Macero Project
Retro Lake
Planeside
Hurrah! A Bolt of Light!
Jocelyn & Chris Arndt
Digital Dharma

The 7th Squeeze
Bern and the Brights
ILL DOOTS
Die Pretty
Parker Ainsworth
Bridgette Guerrette
Wooly and the Mammoth
Treehouse!
Black Mountain Symphony
Titanics
Chris Dukes
The Racer
The Soviet
John Brodeur
Wolf Critton
Ula Ruth
Brown Bread and Von Holt
Barons in the Attic
The Big Takeover
Satellite Hearts
Young Cardinals
Fairhaven
True Apothecary
Seth Adam
Jensen Keets
Chris Mahoney Project
The Daydreamers

Cosmal
Hug the Dog
BeCa
Ch!nch!lla
Last One Out
Von Shakes
Signal for Pilot
Vontus
Carl Daniels
BLUEfiveone
Matt Mango
Sticklips
The Blackboard Nails
The Happy Problem
Harbour Grace
NWSPR
Hijinx
Erin Harkes
Party Boat
This Renaissance
The Ameros
Lauren Hurley
Native Alien Tribe
Snowflake
Linear North
Oogee Wawa
Craving Strange

Last Stand for Lucy
Billy Keane
Farewell Luna
Revolving One
Ballroom Jacks
Playing with Sound
The Lucky Jukebox Brigade
Holly and Evan
Oobleck
Casey Dinkin
Steve Babcock
The Spectacular Average Boys
Rick O'Disko
Frank Palangi
Molly Durnin
Cats Don't Have Souls
Laerlooper
The Accents
Barkeater
electrik buddha
Palemen
Reckless Serenade
River Eater
Frankie Lessard
The Elements
The Greys
Kristin Turo

2012
The inaugural Move Music Festival took place on April 21, 2012 with a lineup including:

The Wombats
Paranoid Social Club
Black Taxi
Mirk
Zing Experience
The Tins
The Involvement
Allison Weiss
Wild Adriatic
Jolly
Find Vienna
The Blackboard Nails
Shout Out the Crowd
Adam Ezra
A Story Left Untold
Days of Season
NWSPR
Brian Mackey
Echo & Drake
Six Stories Told
Alex Montanez
The Black Ships
The Show

The Aviation Orange
Pete Herger
SILVERSYDE
Wolf Critton
Runaway Dorothy
Swear and Shake
Around the World and Back
Dead Leaf Echo
Freak Owls
Sticklips
Skeletons in the Piano
Charles Scopoletti
My Name is Drew
Die Pretty
The City Never Sleeps
Bern & the Brights
The Blind Spots
7th Squeeze
A Fire with Friends
A Social State
Jordan White
The Few
Cosmonauts

The Chelsea Kills
Harbour Grace
The Happy Problem
Last One Out
The Red Lions
Mercies
Smittix
Designer Junkies
National Hotel
Sound System
Eastbound Jesus
Olivia Quillio
Evolutionary War
Automatic Children
Black Mountain Symphony
Headband Jack
Pat Tiernan
True Apothecary
Halliday
Tony Lee Thomas
The Ameros
Brown Bread and Von Holt
Erin Harkes

The Spectacular Average Boys
The Titanics
The Lucky Jukebox Brigade
Ula Ruth
Synapse Factory
My Favorite Fence
The Getdown
Last Remaining Pinnacle
Glitter Freeze
Wilbur by the Sea
Burns and Kristy
Playing with Sound
Gracies Paris
The Grand Design
Jensen Keets
Hug the Dog
Pistola
Hard Soul
Kat Quinn
Catching Cadence
Carl Daniels
Seth Adam

References

External links
official website

Music festivals in New York (state)
Rock festivals in the United States
Music festivals established in 2012
Indie rock festivals
Culture of Albany, New York